The Boreal Sea was a Mesozoic-era seaway that lay along the northern border of Laurasia.

References 

Historical oceans
Prehistory of the Arctic